Julius Norris Mallonee (April 4, 1900 – October 26, 1934) was an outfielder in Major League Baseball. He played for the Chicago White Sox in 1925.

References

External links

1900 births
1934 deaths
Major League Baseball outfielders
Chicago White Sox players
Greensboro Patriots players
Durham Bulls players
Baseball players from Charlotte, North Carolina